Theresa Russell is an American actress who began her career in a supporting role in Elia Kazan's The Last Tycoon (1976), playing the daughter of a prominent film executive. In 1978, she starred opposite Dustin Hoffman in the critically acclaimed crime drama Straight Time, following a lead role in the CBS miniseries Blind Ambition, portraying the wife of U.S. White House Counsel John Dean.

Her next role was a lead in English filmmaker Nicolas Roeg's controversial thriller Bad Timing (1980), which earned critical praise, in which Russell portrayed an American woman in Vienna who enters a dysfunctional relationship with a psychoanalyst. Bad Timing marked the first of six projects Russell and Roeg would collaborate on following their marriage in 1982; subsequent collaborations include the drama Eureka (1983); the experimental alternate history film Insignificance (1985), in which Russell portrayed Marilyn Monroe; and the dramas Track 29 (1989) and Cold Heaven (1991).

Russell had a mainstream commercial breakthrough portraying a serial killer in Bob Rafelson's neo-noir film Black Widow (1987). Other roles from this time included the crime drama Physical Evidence (1989), co-starring Burt Reynolds, and Sondra Locke's thriller Impulse (1990). In 1991, Russell starred as a prostitute in Ken Russell's satirical drama Whore, followed by Steven Soderbergh's experimental black-and-white feature, Kafka, co-starring Jeremy Irons.

After appearing in a number of independent films in the mid-1990s, Russell had a supporting role in the commercially successful neo-noir Wild Things (1998), and the critically acclaimed drama The Believer (2001). In 2005, she had a supporting role on the HBO miniseries Empire Falls, followed by a minor part in Sam Raimi's Spider-Man 3 (2007).

Film

Television

References

Actress filmographies
American filmographies